Oleg Valerievich Znarok (born 2 January 1963) is a Soviet-Latvian professional ice hockey player. In 2022, he was the head coach of Ak Bars Kazan in the Kontinental Hockey League (KHL) and consultant of the Russia men's national ice hockey team.

Internationally, he guided Russia to gold, silver, two bronze performances in the 2014, 2015, 2016 and 2017 IIHF World Championships, respectively, and to a gold medal at the 2018 Winter Olympics. Znarok coached the Latvian national team at five IIHF World Championships, two IIHF World U-20 Championships and one IIHF World U-18 Championship.

He had coached Dynamo Moscow to back to back Gagarin Cup championships, in the 2011–12 and 2012–13 seasons, and a Continental Cup in 2013–14 season. As well taking HC MVD to an appearance in the Gagarin Cup final of the 2009–10 season, losing in seven games.

Early and personal life
Oleg Znarok was born 2 January 1963 in Ust-Katav, Russian SFSR, USSR, present-day Russian Federation. His father, Valeri Znarok, was a football (soccer) player at the time, who later had a long coaching career. A young Oleg was introduced to hockey, when his grandfather brought him and his younger brother to a local skating rink.

Znarok had a successful and long career as a player before moving on to coaching. Playing for 23 years, across several leagues: Soviet, German, as well as several games in the Czech Extraliga and the AHL of North America.

One of Znarok's youth teammates from Traktor Chelyabinsk was Vyachislav Bykov, who played for CSKA Moscow and the Soviet National Team. Bykov, after a successful playing career, coached the Russian National Team to back to back gold medals in 2008 and 2009 at the IIHF World Championships. He'd be replaced (after finishing 6th at the 2010 Winter Olympics and 4th at the 2011 IIHF WC) in favor of Zinetula Bilyaletdinov, a former star player of rival Dynamo Moscow, who coached the Russian team to a gold medal in 2012, posting an undefeated record of 10–0. In turn, he too was replaced (after finishing 5th at the 2014 Winter Olympics): this time in favor of Znarok himself. Znarok coached Russia to a gold medal in 2014, also going 10–0, winning silver in 2015 and two bronze medals in 2016 and 2017. He also led Russia to a 4th-place finish at the 2016 World Cup of Hockey.

Oleg is married. He and his wife Ilona, have two daughters, Valeria and Alisa. Valeria is in marketing and Alisa is a model. Alisa is currently married to hockey player Artemi Panarin.

Oleg first saw his wife in the stands at a hockey game. She was not a sports fan, but came out to support her friends. Seeing her again at a post match celebration, at a local restaurant, Oleg worked up the courage to approach her. They have been together ever since.

In the attic of their house, Ilona has put together something of a museum of hockey memorabilia. Among other items, it holds Znarok's ever growing collection of medals, awards and jerseys. One such item is an NHL contract that Oleg was given to sign by the Boston Bruins, untranslated. As Oleg did not speak English and had no one nearby to translate it for him, he turned it down when he thought the dollar amount was too low. It was only a decade later that he found out that the numbers written down, the only part he could understand, were for a monthly salary and not a yearly one.

Playing career
Znarok started his ice hockey career at Traktor Chelyabinsk, making his debut in the 1979–80 season. Over the next few years he made intermittent appearances with the top team and played 18 games during the 1981–82 season. Although not productive at the senior level as a teenager, his first career goal came against the legendary Soviet goaltender Vladislav Tretiak.

From 1983 until 1991, he represented Dinamo Riga, where he became a top level player and an all-time club legend. The 1984–85 season saw Znarok's breakout with 27 points in 52 games. He scored 14 goals and 13 assists, after putting up only 3 assists in 30 games, the previous season. In 1987–88 season, he led his team to a second-place finish in the Soviet Championship League's playoffs, losing 3–1 to CSKA Moscow in the final. The 1990–91 season was Znarok's best individual season, putting up 51 points in 44 games scoring 24 goals, 27 assists. In total, he amassed 221 points over 361 games in the Soviet league. Scoring 101 goals and 120 assists.

In the 1991–92 season he played 6 games with the Maine Mariners of the American Hockey League (AHL), scoring 3 goals and 1 assist.

Znarok had a two-game (1 goal, 1 assist) outing in the Czech Extraliga during the 1993–94 playoffs, for Vítkovice.

Between the 1992–93 and 2001–02 seasons, he represented various clubs in Germany. In the 1992–93 season, he helped EV Landsberg earn a promotion from the Oberliga to the 2nd Bundesliga, on the strength of his astonishing 220 points in just 66 games, scoring 77 goals and 143 assists.

At the age of 30, he began his 9-year-long participation in the 2nd Bundesliga. He was a highly dominant player for the rest of his playing career, representing EV Landsberg, EHC Freiburg and Heilbronner EC. Scoring 1,069 points in 461 games in the regular season, on the strength of 388 goals and 681 assists. Also, adding 33 points (9 goals, 24 assists) over 22 playoff games. After the 2001–02 season, Znarok retired as a player. That season, he had put up 63 points (16 goals, 47 assists) over 45 games and added another 7 points (1 goal, 6 assists) in 6 playoff games.

International play

Soviet Union
In 1981, Znarok was called up to the Soviet Union under-18 team, where he became a European champion, putting up 16 points (8 goals, 8 assists) in 5 games.

The 1989 Super Series, in which Soviet clubs faced National Hockey League (NHL) clubs, Dinamo Riga was one of two Soviet representatives. Znarok played in 3 games scoring 1 goal.

As he was a Dinamo Riga player, he was also a part of the larger Dynamo sports society. This allowed him in 1990 to be loaned to Dynamo Moscow's squad for their Super Series tour of North America. He scored 2 goals, including one against the Toronto Maple Leafs and one against the Buffalo Sabres, over 4 games.

In 1990, he was called up to the Soviet Union national team for the Japan Cup, where he put up 8 points (4 goals, 4 assists) over 4 games.

Latvia
Following the collapse of the Soviet Union, Znarok represented Latvia in international competition. He played in 5 IIHF World Championships and help promote Latvia to the top division of international competition in 1996. In 1997, he helped Latvia to its best ever placing of seventh in the world. In total he put up 35 points in 34 games, scoring 18 goals.

His first effort was in Division B. Latvia finished second to Slovakia after 6 wins and 1 loss in 7 games. Znarok put up 8 points (4 goals, 4 assists) in 8 games and 18 PIM.

In his second effort, now as captain in 1996, Latvia improved to first in Division B after 6 wins and 1 draw in 7 games. Znarok led the tournament with 6 goals in 6 games and added 2 assists with 18 PIM, making the All-Star team. In the last game of the tournament, Latvia needed a tie or a win against Switzerland, to gain promotion. A loss would have given Switzerland the promotion. Down 1–0, Znarok scored to tie the game, 1–1. Latvia earned a promotion to the elite division for next year's championship.

In his third effort, Latvia faced some of the top national teams of the world, placed in a group with Canada, United States and Sweden. Not expected to show much, having just been promoted, Latvia greatly surprised the hockey world. Znarok lead the team with 10 points in 8 games. He was tied for 5th in tournament points and tied for 2nd in assists, with 7. Znarok led his team to a seventh-place finish, the highest ever finish for Latvia.

In his fourth effort and second as captain, Latvia finished ninth. In the consolation round establishing 9-12th place standings, there were some highlights. A 5–0 win over Germany and a 3–2 win against United States, avenging the previous year's loss. This sent the American and German teams to next year's qualification tournaments to fight against relegation. The American team was successful and remained in the elite division for 1999. The German team, however, was only back in the elite division in 2001. Znarok put up 8 points (5 goals, 3 assists) in 8 games.

The 1999 edition marked Znarok's fifth and final effort (third as captain). Latvia finished eleventh. As a result, next year they were forced to play a qualification tournament to remain in the elite group. At 36, Znarok only managed 1 assist and was limited to only 6 games.

Career statistics

Regular season and playoffs

International

Coaching career
After finishing his playing career, Znarok began coaching.

In 2002–03, he was an assistant coach for the Latvian national team, while in 2003–04, Znarok was the head coach of the under-18 national team, as well as the head for Prizma Riga of the Latvian Hockey Higher League. From 2004 to 2006, he was the head coach of the under-20 national team and the head coach of SK Riga 20 of the Latvian Hockey Higher League, and an assistant coach, with the Latvian national team at two World Championships, 2006 Olympic qualifiers and 2006 Olympics. From 2006 to 2011, Znarok coached the Latvian national team at five World Championships and at 2010 Olympics as well as coaching SK Riga 20 through the 2007–08 season.

From 2008 to 2014, Znarok was the head coach of MVD of Kontinental Hockey League (KHL) for two seasons, before its merger with Dynamo Moscow and continued head coaching for the next four seasons. On 26 March 2014, Znarok joined the Russian national team, and coached them at 3 World Championships, various stages of EHT and the 2016 World Cup of Hockey. Znarok achieved a flawless record with Russia during his first year as coach at the 2014 IIHF World Championship, although he has yet to beat the 29 World Championship game winning streak established by Vyacheslav Bykov. On 1 June 2016, he was named head coach of SKA Saint Petersburg, in the Kontinental Hockey League (KHL) with whom he won the 2016–17 Gagarin Cup. From 2016 to 2018, he was the head coach of both SKA and the Russian national team.

Coaching record

International record

Awards and achievements

Playing awards
Soviet Union national under-18 team:
1981 – gold medal

Soviet Championship League:
1987-88 – silver medal

Latvian national team:
1996 Division B – gold medal
1996 Division B – All-Star Team

Coaching awards
Russian national team:
2014 – gold medal
2015 – silver medal
2016 – bronze medal
2016 WCH – 4th place
2017 – bronze medal
2018 – gold medal
 
KHL:
Gagarin Cup – 2011–12, 2012–13, 2016–17
KHL Coach of the year – 2009–10, 2011–12, 2012–13
KHL Continental Cup – 2013–14

Latvian under-20 team:
2005 Division-1 Promotion to 2006 World Junior Ice Hockey Championships

State awards
2012 – Order of Friendship
2014 – Order of Honour

References

External links
 
 
 Heilbronner Falken: Einbürgerung perfekt
	

1963 births
Dinamo Riga players
EHC Freiburg players
EV Landsberg players
HC Vítkovice players
Heilbronner EC players
Soviet emigrants to Latvia
Latvian emigrants to Germany
Latvian ice hockey coaches
Latvian ice hockey centres
Latvia men's national ice hockey team coaches
Living people
Maine Mariners players
Naturalized citizens of Germany
People from Chelyabinsk Oblast
Recipients of the Order of Honour (Russia)
Soviet ice hockey centres
Russia men's national ice hockey team coaches
Ice hockey coaches at the 2018 Winter Olympics
Latvian expatriate sportspeople in the United States
Expatriate ice hockey players in the United States
Expatriate ice hockey players in the Czech Republic
Expatriate ice hockey players in Germany
Latvian expatriate sportspeople in the Czech Republic
Latvian expatriate sportspeople in Germany
Olympic gold medalists for Russia
Medalists at the 2018 Winter Olympics
Latvian expatriate sportspeople in Russia
Olympic medalists in ice hockey